Thomas J. Burch (born July 19, 1931) is an American politician in the state of Kentucky.

Burch, born in Louisville, attended Bellarmine College, graduating in 1959 in business. He served in the United States Navy and United States Naval Reserve from 1948 to 1956, and also worked for General Electric from 1953 to 1991 as a production control manager. He was elected to the Kentucky House of Representatives initially in 1972, serving a single term, until 1975. He elected again in 1977 to represent district 30, as a Democrat, and has served since. Committees he served on currently are: Budget Review Subcommittee on Human Resources, Health and Welfare (Chair) House Budget Review Subcommittee on Human Resources, Interim Joint Committee on Health and Welfare (Co-chair), Interim Joint Committee on Licensing and Occupations, Interim Joint Committee on Veterans, Military Affairs, and Public Protection, Licensing and Occupations, and Veterans, Military Affairs, and Public Safety.

Awards received include:
 Distinguished Service Award, Jefferson County Health Board
 Kentucky Association of Homes for Children Circle of Love Award
 Kentucky Outstanding Legislator Award for Health Legislation
Kidney Foundation Legislative Award
 Legislator of the Year Child Support Enforcement 1990

A Catholic by religion, Burch is married to Patty McDevitt and has five children and resides in Louisville. He is a member a board member of Brooklawn Youth Services, and a member of the Home of the Innocents, Kentucky Domestic Violence Association, Kentucky Organ Donor Council, Kentucky Welfare Reform Coalition, Kosair Children's Hospital, Lions Foundation, and the National Organization for Women.

In 2010, Burch released a statement regarding alleged sexual abuse he experienced as a youth by a Catholic priest.

In 2022, Burch was defeated by Daniel Grossberg in the Democratic primary election.

References

External links
 Official website

1931 births
Living people
Democratic Party members of the Kentucky House of Representatives
Politicians from Louisville, Kentucky
Bellarmine University alumni
Businesspeople from Kentucky
21st-century American politicians